The Slater Cup is the trophy awarded to the winner of the rugby match between Gloucester and Leicester Tigers twice every season in the Gallagher Premiership.

History
In November 2022, Gloucester Rugby and Leicester Tigers announced that they would compete for a trophy named after Ed Slater. Slater played for both clubs but was diagnosed with Motor Neurone Disease in July 2022 which forced him to retire.

In February 2023, Gloucester Rugby announced that for the first Slater Cup game held at Kingsholm that they would play in a limited edition Slater Cup shirt. The shirt was designed by Ed, his wife Jo, and his three children. The club also announced that £10 from every shirt sold would go directly to the Slater family to aid Ed’s treatment and adaptations to his home, while also providing valuable financial support to his young family. The shirt is also designed to raise important awareness of MND.

Results

Results summary

Records
The current record number of points scored by a player in a Slater Cup game was set by Freddie Burns in 2022 when he scored 17 points (2 conversions and 3 penalties). The most tries scored in a Slater Cup fixture is held by Anthony Watson set in 2022 when he scored 2.

Longest winning streak: 2 – Leicester
Longest losing streak: 2 – Gloucester 
Biggest winning margin: 21 points – Gloucester 5–26 Leiceter, March 2023
Smallest winning margin: 15 points – Leicester 28–13 Gloucester, December 2022

References

External links

Premiership Rugby
Rugby union trophies and awards
Leicester Tigers matches
Gloucester Rugby
Recurring sporting events established in 2022